Derek Mecham Smith (born January 18, 1975) is a former American football linebacker who played in the National Football League (NFL).  He was drafted by the Washington Redskins in the third round of the 1997 NFL Draft.  He played college football at Arizona State.

Smith also played for the San Francisco 49ers, San Diego Chargers and Miami Dolphins.

College career
At Arizona State University, Smith was good friends with Pat Tillman and was a teammate to Jake Plummer.

Professional career

Washington Redskins
Smith played for the Redskins for four years from 1997 to 2000.

San Francisco 49ers
Smith then signed with the San Francisco 49ers in 2001.  He played with the team through 2007 before being waived on February 19, 2008.

San Diego Chargers
On February 24, 2008, the Chargers signed Smith to a two-year contract.  He was released ten weeks into the regular season on November 12 after running back Michael Bennett was claimed off waivers.

Miami Dolphins
Smith was signed by the Miami Dolphins on December 22, 2008.

References

1975 births
Living people
People from American Fork, Utah
American football linebackers
Arizona State Sun Devils football players
Washington Redskins players
San Francisco 49ers players
San Diego Chargers players
Miami Dolphins players
Players of American football from Utah